John Martin Schaeberle (1853–1924) was a German-American astronomer.

Schaeberle may also refer to:

 Schaeberle (lunar crater)
 Schaeberle (Martian crater)